Goriakothi is a community development block and a town in district of Siwan, in the Bihar state of India. It is one of six blocks in the Maharajganj Subdivision. The headquarters of the block is in Goriyakothi town.

The block is divided into many Gram Panchayats and villages.

Gram Panchayats
The Gram Panchayats in the Goriyakothi block are:

Ageyan
Barhoga pursotim
Bhithi
Bindawal
Dudhara
Goriyakothi
Hariharpur kala
Harpur
Hetimpur
Jamo
Karnpura
Lilaru aurangabad
Mahamadpur
Majhawaliya
Mustafabad
Sadipura
Saidpura
Sani Basantpur
Sarari dakshin
Sarari uttar
Satwar
Sisai

See also
Maharajganj Subdivision
Administration in Bihar

References

Community development blocks in Siwan district